Automatic may refer to:

Music

Bands 
 Automatic (band), Australian rock band
 Automatic (American band), American rock band
 The Automatic, a Welsh alternative rock band

Albums 
 Automatic (Jack Bruce album), a 1983 electronic rock album
 Automatic (Sharpe & Numan album), a 1989 synthpop album
 Automatic (The Jesus and Mary Chain album), a 1989 alternative rock album
 Automatic, a 1997 electronic album by Le Car
 Automatic (Dweezil Zappa album), a 2000 hard rock album, or the title song
 Automatic, a 2003 punk rock album by The Turbo A.C.'s
 Automatic (Stitches album), a 2006 punk rock album, or the title song
 Automatic (VNV Nation album), a 2011 futurepop album
 Automatic, a 2013 reggae-rock album by Iration
 Automatic (Don Broco album), a 2015 rock album
 Automatic (Kaskade album), 2015 album by Kaskade
 Automatic (Mildlife album), 2020 album by Mildlife

Songs 
 "Automatic" (Danny Fernandes song), 2010
 "Automatic" (The Get Up Kids song), 2011
 "Automatic" (Miranda Lambert song), 2014
 "Automatic" (Nicki Minaj song), by Nicki Minaj from the 2012 album Pink Friday: Roman Reloaded
"Automatic", by Prince on his 1982 album 1999
 "Automatic" (Pointer Sisters song), 1984
 "Automatic" (Red Velvet song), 2015 song by Red Velvet
 "Automatic" (Sarah Whatmore song), 2003
 "Automatic" (Teairra Mari song), 2009
 "Automatic" (Tokio Hotel song), 2009
 "Automatic" (Hikaru Utada song), 1998
 "Automatic Pt. II", by Hikaru Utada, released under the stage name Utada, from the 2009 album This Is the One
 "Automatik", a single by Livvi Franc from the 2010 album Livvi Franc
 "Automatic", a song by 808 State from the 1988 album Prebuild
 "Automatic", a song by The Dismemberment Plan on the 2001 album Change
 "Automatic", a song by The Red Devils on the 1992 album King King (album)
 "Automatic", a song by Less Than Jake on the 1996 album Losing Streak
 "Automatic", a song by Weezer on the 2008 album Weezer
 "Automatic", a song by Nicki Minaj on the 2012 album Pink Friday: Roman Reloaded
 "Automatic", a song by Amaranthe on the 2011 album Amaranthe
 "Automatic", a song by Red Velvet on the 2015 mini album Ice Cream Cake (EP)
 "Automatic", a song by Chancellor, Babylon, twlv, Moon, Bibi, and Jiselle, 2020

Technology 
 Automatic transmission, or a car with an automatic transmission
 Automatic Knives
 Automatic firearm
 Automatic variable
 Automatic watch
 Automatic (automobile company), a defunct American automobile company

Film 
 Automatic (1995 film), an action film starring Olivier Gruner
 Automatic (2001 film), starring Jazsmin Lewis

Other uses
Bruce Vanderveer, American music producer professionally known as Automatic

See also 
 Automat (disambiguation)
 Automata (disambiguation)
 Automaticity
 Automatik (disambiguation)
 Automation (disambiguation)
 Automaton
 Automattic, a web development corporation